The Tunisian Handball Cup is an elimination handball tournament held annually in Tunisia. It is the second local most important competition in  handball after the Tunisian Handball League. It started in 1956, just after Tunisia had gained its Independence, The tournament is dominated mostly by two teams from Tunis with Espérance de Tunis won 28 tournament Cups as a record 16 of them are consecutive followed by Club Africain with 19 Cups and Third team we find Etoile du Sahel with 7 Cups, however The tournament winners will represent Tunisia in the African Handball Cup Winners' Cup.

Winners list

Most successful clubs

See also 
Tunisian Handball League
Tunisian Women's Handball League
Tunisian Women's Handball Cup

External links 
  Tunisia Handball INFO 

Handball in Tunisia
1956 establishments in Tunisia